Monthly Notices of the Royal Astronomical Society (MNRAS) is a peer-reviewed scientific journal covering research in astronomy and astrophysics. It has been in continuous existence since 1827 and publishes letters and papers reporting original research in relevant fields. Despite the name, the journal is no longer monthly, nor does it carry the notices of the Royal Astronomical Society.

History
The first issue of MNRAS was published on 9 February 1827 as Monthly Notices of the Astronomical Society of London and it has been in continuous publication ever since. It took its current name from the second volume, after the Astronomical Society of London became the Royal Astronomical Society (RAS). Until 1960 it carried the monthly notices of the RAS, at which time these were transferred to the newly established Quarterly Journal of the Royal Astronomical Society (1960–1996) and then to its successor journal Astronomy & Geophysics (since 1997). Until 1965, MNRAS was published in-house by the society; from 1965 to 2012 it was published by Blackwell Publishing (later part of Wiley-Blackwell) on behalf of the RAS. From 2013, MNRAS is published by Oxford University Press (OUP).

The journal is no longer monthly, with thirty-six issues a year divided into nine volumes.  The Letters section had originally appeared on pink paper in the print edition, but moved online only in the early 2000s. Print publication ceased after the April 2020 volume, during the COVID-19 pandemic, with the journal becoming online-only.

Content
MNRAS publishes peer-reviewed articles on original research in astronomy and astrophysics. Two sorts of article are carried by MNRAS: papers, which can be of any length, and letters, which are published more quickly but are limited to five pages in length.

Open access
The stated policy of the RAS is "to focus on high quality papers through rigorous peer review and, as far as practicable, to provide free publication". Authors are not charged for publishing in MNRAS, with the costs of publications being met by subscriptions. MNRAS provides a form of open access by providing authors with the option to pay for publication, allowing free access by anyone without charge (hybrid open-access model). Fellows of the RAS are given free online access to the RAS journals as part of their membership benefits. Downloadable PDF versions of MNRAS articles are made available 36 months after publication (delayed open-access model), on both the journal website and the Astrophysics Data System. MNRAS also permits self-archiving by authors on personal webpages, in institutional repositories, and on the arXiv server (green open access). Also, authors are provided with a link to a perpetually freely accessible PDF file, the idea being that the file itself should not be hosted by the author nor by anyone except the publisher, while the link to it can be freely distributed. This is the modern equivalent of offprints, paper copies of the article which used to be provided to the author to distribute, freely, as he or she saw fit. Authors do not assign copyright to the RAS or OUP, but are required to grant an exclusive licence to publish the article prior to its publication.

Editors-in-chief 

The following persons have served as Editor-in-Chief (formerly titled Managing Editor or simply Editor):
David Flower (2012–present)
Robert Carswell (2008–2012)
Andy Fabian (1994–2008)
John Shakeshaft (?–1994)
Roger Tayler (1979–?)
Function performed by the Secretaries of the RAS Council (1881–1979)
Arthur Cayley (1874–1881)
Richard Proctor (1872–1874)
Arthur Cayley (1860–1872)
Robert Grant (?–1881)
Richard Sheepshanks

Abstracting and indexing 
The journal is abstracted and indexed in:

See also
The Astronomical Journal
The Astrophysical Journal
Astronomy & Astrophysics
Astronomy & Geophysics

References

Citations

Works cited

External links 
 

Astronomy journals
Publications established in 1827
Oxford University Press academic journals
English-language journals
Royal Astronomical Society academic journals
Astronomy in the United Kingdom
1827 establishments in the United Kingdom
Journals published between 27 and 51 times per year